Ptilidiales is an order of liverworts.

Taxonomy
 Herzogianthaceae Stotler & Crandall-Stotler 2009
 Herzogianthus Schuster 1961 [Anoplostoma Hodgson & Allison 1962]
 Neotrichocoleaceae Inoue 1974
 Neotrichocolea Hattori 1947
 Trichocoleopsis Okamura 1911
 Ptilidiaceae von Klinggräff 1858
 Ptilidium Nees 1833 [Blepharozia Dumortier 1835]

References

 
Liverwort orders